The Diocese of Lagos West is one of the 13 dioceses of the Anglican Province of Lagos, in the Church of Nigeria (Anglican Communion). It comprises 29 archdeaconries. The diocese's cathedral is Archbishop Vining Memorial Church Cathedral, in Ikeja. The diocese was inaugurated at 20 November 1999. The first bishop was the Right Reverend Dr. Peter Awelewa Adebiyi, who served as bishop from the diocese's creation in 2000 until 2013. The current bishop is the Right Reverend Dr. James Odedeji.

The Diocese of Lagos West currently comprises 29 archdeaconries: Abule Egba, Agege, Amuwo Odofin, Bariga, Egbe, Festac, Gowon Estate, Iba, Idimu, Ijede, Iju-Ishaga, Ikeja, Ikorodu, Ikorodu-North, Ikosi-Ketu, Ikotun, Imota, Ipaja, Isolo, Ogudu, Ojo, Ojo-Alaba, Ojodu, Opebi, Oshodi, Oto Awori, Owutu, Satellite, and Somolu.

References

External links
Diocese of Lagos West Official Website

Church of Nigeria dioceses
Dioceses of the Province of Lagos